John Moses may refer to:
John Moses (Norwegian politician) (1781–1849), member of the Norwegian Constituent Assembly
John Moses (Illinois politician) (1825–1898), Illinois judge and politician
John Moses (American politician) (1885–1945), governor of North Dakota
John Moses (baseball) (born 1957), American baseball player
John Moses (priest), English clergyman
John A. Moses (born 1930), Australian historian
John J. Moses (born 1943), American clarinetist